Kitolano is a surname. Notable people with this surname include:

 John Kitolano (born 1999), Congolese-Norwegian football player
 Joshua Kitolano (born 2001), Norwegian football player